The Chung Hsing Cultural and Creative Park is a multi-purpose park in Wujie Township, Yilan County, Taiwan.

History
The building was originally constructed in 1935 as a paper manufacturing company. They produced papers using silvergrass and sugarcane waste pulping technology. In 1959, the company became a state-owned enterprise and was renamed Taiwan Chung Hsing Paper Corporation. They modernized their paper manufacturing process by using chemical processes. Their main products were newsprint, banknotes, lottery paper, toilet paper and wood-free paper. In 2001, the factory ceased operations and was taken over by Yilan County Government in 2014. It was then transformed into Chung Hsing Cultural and Creative Park.

Activities
The park regularly hosts various exhibitions, stage performances and group tours of the old factory buildings.

Transportation
The park is accessible within walking distance west from Zhongli Station of Taiwan Railways.

See also
 List of tourist attractions in Taiwan

References

External links

 

Industrial buildings completed in 1935
Pulp and paper mills
Tourist attractions in Yilan County, Taiwan